Hasna Xhukiçi (born April 13, 1988, Fier) is an Albanian model and beauty pageant titleholder who was crowned Miss Universe Albania 2009 and represented Albania at Miss Universe 2009 in the Bahamas.

Miss Universe 2009
Hasna placed as one of the top 15 semifinalists competing in swimsuit, missing the top ten second cut by a few points. Albania took last place and debuted with Anisa Kospiri in Miss Universe 2002.

References

External links
Hasna Xhukiçi at Miss Universe 
Fadil Berisha nominates Hasna Xhukiçi

1988 births
Living people
Albanian beauty pageant winners
Albanian female models
Miss Universe 2009 contestants
People from Fier
21st-century Albanian models